Rameshwar Nath Koul Bamezai is an Indian scientist in the field of human genetics and cancer biology. He is the coordinator of the National Centre of Applied Human Genetics, School of Life Sciences, Jawaharlal Nehru University (New Delhi). He has served as the Vice chancellor of Shri Mata Vaishno Devi University. He was honoured with the Padma Shri Award by the President of India for his contributions to the fields of science and technology, in 2012. An elected fellow of the National Academy of Medical Sciences, he has published many articles on his research.

References 

Living people
1951 births
Recipients of the Padma Shri in science & engineering
Indian geneticists
Fellows of the Indian National Science Academy
Fellows of the National Academy of Medical Sciences
Scientists from Jammu and Kashmir
People from Srinagar
20th-century Indian biologists